Boris Bulajić (Cyrillic: Борис Булајић, born 27 April 1988) is a Montenegrin footballer, who plays for Borac Čačak.

External links 
 Profile at HLSZ.
 

1988 births
Living people
Footballers from Nikšić
Association football midfielders
Montenegrin footballers
Montenegro under-21 international footballers
FK Sutjeska Nikšić players
FK Čelik Nikšić players
Kecskeméti TE players
FK Rudar Pljevlja players
OFK Grbalj players
FK Borac Čačak players
FK Iskra Danilovgrad players
Montenegrin First League players
Nemzeti Bajnokság I players
Montenegrin expatriate footballers
Expatriate footballers in Hungary
Montenegrin expatriate sportspeople in Hungary
Expatriate footballers in Serbia
Montenegrin expatriate sportspeople in Serbia